Arcola is an unincorporated community in Upper Providence Township, Montgomery County, Pennsylvania.

References

Unincorporated communities in Montgomery County, Pennsylvania
Unincorporated communities in Pennsylvania